Yana Kunkush (Quechua yana black, Ancash Quechua kunkush Puya raimondii, "black puya raimondii (mountain)", also spelled Yanacuncush) is a mountain in the southern part of the Cordillera Negra in the Andes of Peru, about  high. It is situated in the Ancash Region, Aija Province, Aija District, and in the Recuay Province, Catac District. Yana Kunkush lies southeast of Sach'a Hirka and east of a lake of that name.

Sources 

Mountains of Peru
Mountains of Ancash Region